Edward Morgan Forster  (1 January 1879 – 7 June 1970) was an English author, best known for his novels, particularly A Room with a View (1908), Howards End (1910) and A Passage to India (1924).

He also wrote numerous short stories, essays, speeches and broadcasts, as well as a limited number of biographies and some pageant plays. He also co-authored the opera Billy Budd (1951). Today, he is considered one of the most successful of the Edwardian era English novelists.

After attending Tonbridge School he studied history and classics at King's College, Cambridge, where he met fellow future writers such as Lytton Strachey and Leonard Woolf. He then travelled throughout Europe before publishing his first novel, Where Angels Fear to Tread in 1905. 

Many of his novels examine class difference and hypocrisy. He was nominated for the Nobel Prize in Literature in 20 separate years.

Life

Early years

Forster, born at 6 Melcombe Place, Dorset Square, London NW1, which no longer stands, was the only child of the Anglo-Irish Alice Clara "Lily" (née Whichelo) and a Welsh architect, Edward Morgan Llewellyn Forster. He was registered as Henry Morgan Forster, but accidentally baptised Edward Morgan Forster. His father died of tuberculosis on 30 October 1880 before Forster's second birthday. In 1883, he and his mother moved to Rooks Nest, near Stevenage, Hertfordshire until 1893. This was to serve as a model for the house Howards End in his novel of that name. It is listed Grade I for historic interest and literary associations. Forster had fond memories of his childhood at Rooks Nest.

Among Forster's ancestors were members of the Clapham Sect, a social reform group in the Church of England. Forster inherited £8,000 in trust from his paternal great-aunt Marianne Thornton (daughter of the abolitionist Henry Thornton), who died on 5 November 1887. This was enough to live on and enabled him to become a writer. He attended as a day boy Tonbridge School in Kent, where the school theatre has been named in his honour, although he is known to have been unhappy there.

At King's College, Cambridge in 1897–1901, he became a member of a discussion society known as the Apostles (formally the Cambridge Conversazione Society). They met in secret to discuss their work on philosophical and moral questions. Many of its members went on to constitute what came to be known as the Bloomsbury Group, of which Forster was a member in the 1910s and 1920s. There is a famous recreation of Forster's Cambridge at the beginning of The Longest Journey. The Schlegel sisters of Howards End are based to some degree on Vanessa and Virginia Stephen. Forster graduated with a BA with second-class honours in both classics and history.

In 1904, Forster travelled in Greece and Italy out of interest in their classical heritage. He then sought a post in Germany, to learn the language, and spent several months in the summer of 1905 in Nassenheide, Pomerania, (now the Polish village of Rzędziny) as a tutor to the children of the writer Elizabeth von Arnim. He wrote a short memoir of this experience, which was one of the happiest times in his life.

In 1906 Forster fell in love with Syed Ross Masood, a 17-year-old Indian future Oxford student he tutored in Latin. Masood had a more romantic, poetic view of friendship, confusing Forster with avowals of love.

After leaving university, Forster travelled in Europe with his mother. They then moved to Weybridge, Surrey, where he wrote all six of his novels.

In 1914, he visited Egypt, Germany and India with the classicist Goldsworthy Lowes Dickinson, by which time he had written all but one of his novels. As a conscientious objector in the First World War, Forster served as a Chief Searcher (for missing servicemen) for the British Red Cross in Alexandria, Egypt. Though conscious of his repressed desires, it was only then, while stationed in Egypt, that he "lost his R [respectability]" to a wounded soldier in 1917.

Forster spent a second spell in India in the early 1920s as private secretary to Tukojirao III, Maharajah of Dewas. The Hill of Devi is his non-fictional account of this period. After returning to London from India, he completed the last novel of his to be published in his lifetime, A Passage to India (1924), for which he won the James Tait Black Memorial Prize for fiction. He also edited the letters of Eliza Fay (1756–1816) from India, in an edition first published in 1925. In 2012, Tim Leggatt, who knew Forster for his last 15 years, wrote a memoir based on unpublished correspondence with him over those years.

Career

After A Passage to India

Forster was awarded a Benson Medal in 1937. In the 1930s and 1940s Forster became a notable broadcaster on BBC Radio, and while George Orwell was the BBC India Section talks producer from 1941 to 1943, he commissioned from Forster a weekly book review. Forster became publicly associated with the British Humanist Association. In addition to his broadcasting, he advocated individual liberty and penal reform and opposed censorship by writing articles, sitting on committees and signing letters.

Forster was open about his homosexuality to close friends, but not to the public. He never married, but had a number of male lovers during his adult life. He developed long-term relations with Bob Buckingham (1904–1975), a married policeman. Forster included Buckingham and his wife May in his circle, which included J. R. Ackerley, a writer and literary editor of The Listener, the psychologist W. J. H. Sprott, and for a time, the composer Benjamin Britten. Other writers with whom he associated included Christopher Isherwood, the poet Siegfried Sassoon, and the Belfast-based novelist Forrest Reid. He was a close friend of the socialist poet and philosopher Edward Carpenter. A visit to Carpenter and his younger lover George Merrill in 1913 inspired Forster's novel Maurice, which is partly based on them.

In 1960, Forster began a relationship with the Bulgarian émigré Mattei Radev, a picture framer and art collector who moved in Bloomsbury group circles. He was Forster's junior by 46 years. They met at Long Crichel House, a Georgian rectory in Long Crichel, Dorset, a country retreat shared by Edward Sackville-West and the gallery-owner and artist Eardley Knollys.

From 1925 until his mother's death at age 90 in March 1945, Forster lived with her at the house West Hackhurst in the village of Abinger Hammer, Surrey, finally leaving in September 1946. His London base was 26 Brunswick Square from 1930 to 1939, after which he rented 9 Arlington Park Mansions in Chiswick until at least 1961. After a fall in April 1961, he spent his final years in Cambridge at King's College.

Forster was elected an honorary fellow of King's College in January 1946, and lived for the most part in the college, doing relatively little. In April 1947 he arrived in America for a three-month nationwide tour of public readings and sightseeing, returning to the East Coast in June. He declined a knighthood in 1949 and was made a Companion of Honour in 1953. At age 82, he wrote his last short story, Little Imber, a science fiction tale. According to his friend Richard Marquand, Forster was critical of American foreign policy in his latter years, which was one reason he refused offers to adapt his novels for the screen, as Forster felt such productions would involve American financing.

At 85 he went on a pilgrimage to the Wiltshire countryside that had inspired his favourite novel The Longest Journey, escorted by William Golding. In 1961 he was one of the first five authors named as a Companion of Literature by the Royal Society of Literature. In 1969 he was made a member of the Order of Merit. Forster died of a stroke on 7 June 1970 at the age of 91, at the Buckinghams' home in Coventry, Warwickshire. His ashes, mingled with those of Buckingham, were later scattered in the rose garden of Coventry's crematorium, near Warwick University.

Work

Novels

Forster had five novels published in his lifetime. Although Maurice was published shortly after his death, it had been written nearly sixty years earlier. He never finished a seventh novel, Arctic Summer.

His first novel, Where Angels Fear to Tread (1905), tells of Lilia, a young English widow who falls in love with an Italian, and of the efforts of her bourgeois relatives to get her back from Monteriano (based on San Gimignano). Philip Herriton's mission to retrieve her from Italy has features in common with that of Lambert Strether in Henry James's The Ambassadors. Forster discussed that work ironically and somewhat disapprovingly in his book Aspects of the Novel (1927). The novel was adapted as a 1991 film directed by Charles Sturridge.

Next, Forster published The Longest Journey (1907), an inverted Bildungsroman following the lame Rickie Elliott from Cambridge to a career as a struggling writer and then a post as a schoolmaster, married to an unappealing Agnes Pembroke. In a series of scenes on the Wiltshire hills, which introduce Rickie's wild half-brother Stephen Wonham, Forster attempts a kind of sublime related to those of Thomas Hardy and D. H. Lawrence.

Forster's third novel, A Room with a View (1908), is his lightest and most optimistic. It was started in 1901, before any of his others, initially under the title Lucy. It explores young Lucy Honeychurch's trip to Italy with a cousin, and the choice she must make between the free-thinking George Emerson and the repressed aesthete Cecil Vyse. George's father Mr Emerson quotes thinkers who influenced Forster, including Samuel Butler. It was adapted as a film of the same name in 1985 by the Merchant Ivory team, starring Helena Bonham Carter and Daniel Day-Lewis, and as a televised adaptation of the same name in 2007 by Andrew Davies.

Where Angels Fear to Tread and A Room with a View can be seen as Forster's Italian novels. Both include references to the famous Baedeker guidebooks and concern narrow-minded middle-class English tourists abroad. The books share themes with his short stories collected in The Celestial Omnibus and The Eternal Moment.

Howards End (1910) is an ambitious "condition-of-England" novel about various groups among the Edwardian middle classes, represented by the Schlegels (bohemian intellectuals), the Wilcoxes (thoughtless plutocrats) and the Basts (struggling lower-middle-class aspirants). Howards End was adapted as a film in 1992 by the Merchant-Ivory team, starring Vanessa Redgrave, Emma Thompson, Anthony Hopkins, and Helena Bonham-Carter. Emma Thompson won the Academy Award for Best Actress for her performance as Margaret Schlegel. It was also adapted as a miniseries in 2017. An opera libretto Howards End, America was created in 2016 by Claudia Stevens.

Forster's greatest success, A Passage to India (1924), takes as its subject the relations between East and West, seen through the lens of India in the later days of the British Raj. Forster connects personal relations with the politics of colonialism through the story of the Englishwoman Adela Quested, the Indian Dr. Aziz, and the question of what did or did not happen between them in the Marabar Caves. Forster makes special mention of the author Ahmed Ali and his Twilight in Delhi in a preface to its Everyman's Library Edition. A Passage to India was adapted as a play in 1960, directed by Frank Hauser, and as a film in 1984, directed by David Lean.

Maurice (1971), published posthumously, is a homosexual love story that also returns to matters familiar from Forster's first three novels, such as the suburbs of London in the English home counties, the experience of attending Cambridge, and the wild landscape of Wiltshire. The novel was controversial, given that Forster's homosexuality had not been known or widely acknowledged. Today's critics continue to argue over the extent to which Forster's sexuality and personal activities influenced his writing. Maurice was adapted as a film in 1987 by the Merchant Ivory team.

Early in his career, Forster attempted a historical novel about the Byzantine scholar Gemistus Pletho and the Italian condottiero Sigismondo de Malatesta, but was dissatisfied with the result and never published it, though he kept the manuscript and later showed it to Naomi Mitchison.

Critical reception

Forster's first novel, Where Angels Fear to Tread, was described by reviewers as "astonishing" and "brilliantly original". The Manchester Guardian (forerunner of The Guardian) noted "a persistent vein of cynicism which is apt to repel," though "the cynicism is not deep-seated." The novel is labelled "a sordid comedy culminating, unexpectedly and with a real dramatic force, in a grotesque tragedy." Lionel Trilling remarked on this first novel as "a whole and mature work dominated by a fresh and commanding intelligence".

Subsequent books were similarly received on publication. The Manchester Guardian commented on Howards End, describing it as "a novel of high quality written with what appears to be a feminine brilliance of perception... witty and penetrating." An essay by David Cecil in Poets and Storytellers (1949) describes Forster as "pulsing with intelligence and sensibility", but primarily concerned with an original moral vision: "He tells a story as well as anyone who ever lived".

US interest in Forster and appreciation for him were spurred by Lionel Trilling's E. M. Forster: A Study, which called him "the only living novelist who can be read again and again and who, after each reading, gives me what few writers can give us after our first days of novel-reading, the sensation of having learned something." 

Criticism of his works has included comment on unlikely pairings of characters who marry or get engaged, and the lack of realistic depiction of sexual attraction.

Key themes

Forster was President of the Cambridge Humanists from 1959 until his death and a member of the Advisory Council of the British Humanist Association from 1963 until his death. His views as a humanist are at the heart of his work, which often depicts the pursuit of personal connections despite the restrictions of contemporary society. His humanist attitude is expressed in the 1938 essay What I Believe (reprinted with two other humanist essays – and an introduction and notes by Nicolas Walter – as What I Believe, and other essays by the secular humanist publishers G. W. Foote & Co. in 1999). When Forster's cousin, Philip Whichelo, donated a portrait of Forster to the Gay and Lesbian Humanist Association (GLHA), Jim Herrick, the founder, quoted Forster's words: "The humanist has four leading characteristics – curiosity, a free mind, belief in good taste, and belief in the human race."

Forster's two best-known works, A Passage to India and Howards End, explore the irreconcilability of class differences. A Room with a View also shows how questions of propriety and class can make human connection difficult. The novel is his most widely read and accessible work, remaining popular long after its original publication. His posthumous novel Maurice explores the possibility of class reconciliation as one facet of a homosexual relationship.

Sexuality is another key theme in Forster's works. Some critics have argued that a general shift from heterosexual to homosexual love can be observed through the course of his writing career. The foreword to Maurice describes his struggle with his homosexuality, while he explored similar issues in several volumes of short stories. Forster's explicitly homosexual writings, the novel Maurice and the short story collection The Life to Come, were published shortly after his death.

Forster is noted for his use of symbolism as a technique in his novels, and he has been criticised (as by his friend Roger Fry) for his attachment to mysticism. One example of his symbolism is the wych elm tree in Howards End. The characters of Mrs Wilcox in that novel and Mrs Moore in A Passage to India have a mystical link with the past, and a striking ability to connect with people from beyond their own circles. Henry James, E. M. Forster and Somerset Maugham were the earliest fiction writers to portray characters from diverse countries – France, Germany, Italy and India. Their work explores cultural conflict, but arguably the motifs of humanism and cosmopolitanism are dominant. In a way this is anticipation of the concept of human beings shedding national identities and becoming more and more liberal and tolerant.

Notable works

Novels
Where Angels Fear to Tread (1905)
The Longest Journey (1907)
A Room with a View (1908)
Howards End (1910)
A Passage to India (1924)
Maurice (written in 1913–14, published posthumously in 1971)

Short stories
The Celestial Omnibus (and other stories) (1911)
The Eternal Moment and other stories (1928)
Collected Short Stories (1947) a combination of the above two titles, containing:
"The Story of a Panic"
"The Other Side of the Hedge"
"The Celestial Omnibus"
"Other Kingdom"
"The Curate's Friend"
"The Road from Colonus"
"The Machine Stops"
"The Point of It"
"Mr Andrews"
"Co-ordination"
"The Story of the Siren"
"The Eternal Moment"
The Life to Come and other stories (1972) (posthumous) containing the following stories written between approximately 1903 and 1960:
"Ansell"
"Albergo Empedocle"
"The Purple Envelope"
"The Helping Hand"
"The Rock"
"The Life to Come"
"Dr Woolacott"
"Arthur Snatchfold"
"The Obelisk"
"What Does It Matter? A Morality"
"The Classical Annex"
"The Torque"
"The Other Boat"
"Three Courses and a Dessert: Being a New and Gastronomic Version of the Old Game of Consequences", of which Forster wrote The Second Course (The First Course was written by Christopher Dilke, The Third Course by A. E. Coppard and The Dessert by James Laver)

Plays and pageants
Abinger Pageant (1934)
England's Pleasant Land (1940)

Film scripts
A Diary for Timothy (1945) (directed by Humphrey Jennings, spoken by Michael Redgrave)

Libretto
Billy Budd (1951) (with Eric Crozier; based on Melville's novel, for the opera by Benjamin Britten)

Collections of essays and broadcasts
Abinger Harvest (1936)
Two Cheers for Democracy (1951)
The Prince's Tale and Other Uncollected Writings (1998)
 Forster in Egypt: A Graeco-Alexandrian Encounter: E.M. Forster's First Interview, eds., Hilda D. Spear and Abdel-Moneim Aly (London, 1987)
 The Uncollected Egyptian Essays of E. M. Forster, eds.,Hilda D. Spear and Abdel-Moneim Aly (Dundee, 1988)

Literary criticism
Aspects of the Novel (1927)
The Feminine Note in Literature (posthumous) (2001)
The Creator as Critic and Other Writings

Biography
Goldsworthy Lowes Dickinson (1934)
Marianne Thornton, A Domestic Biography (1956)

Travel writing
Alexandria: A History and Guide (1922)
Pharos and Pharillon (A Novelist's Sketchbook of Alexandria Through the Ages) (1923)
The Hill of Devi (1953)

Miscellaneous writings
Selected Letters (1983–85)
Commonplace Book (facsimile ed. 1978; edited by Philip Gardner, 1985)
Locked Diary (2007) (held at King's College, Cambridge)
Arctic Summer (novel fragment, written in 1912–13, published posthumously in 2003)
Rooksnest (1894 and 1901), a description by Forster of his childhood home, on which he based Howards End.

Notable films and drama based upon Forster's fiction

The Machine Stops (1966), dramatised for the BBC anthology series Out of the Unknown
A Passage to India (1984), dir. David Lean
A Room with a View (1985), dir. James Ivory
Maurice (1987), dir. James Ivory
Where Angels Fear to Tread (1991), dir. Charles Sturridge
Howards End (1992), dir. James Ivory
Howards End (2017), BBC One miniseries, dir. Hettie MacDonald
The Inheritance (2018), play by Matthew Lopez, adapted from Howards End, and featuring Forster as a character

References

Further reading
M. H. Abrams and Stephen Greenblatt, "E. M. Forster." The Norton Anthology of English Literature, Vol. 2C, 7th Edition. New York: W. W. Norton, 2000: 2131–2140
J. R. Ackerley, E. M. Forster: A Portrait (London: Ian McKelvie, 1970)
Parminder Kaur Bakshi, Distant Desire. Homoerotic Codes and the Subversion of the English Novel in E. M. Forster's Fiction (New York, 1996)
Nicola Beauman, Morgan (London, 1993)
Lawrence Brander, E. M. Forster. A critical study (London, 1968)
E. K. Brown, Rhythm in the Novel (University of Toronto Press, Canada, 1950)
Glen Cavaliero, A Reading of E.M. Forster (London, 1979)
S. M. Chanda, "A Passage to India: A Close Look" in A Collection of Critical Essays, New Delhi: Atlantic Publishers
Stuart Christie, Worlding Forster: The Passage from Pastoral (Routledge, 2005)
John Colmer, E. M. Forster – The personal voice (London, 1975)
Frederick Crews, E. M. Forster: The Perils of Humanism (Textbook Publishers, 2003)
E. M. Forster, ed. by Norman Page, Macmillan Modern Novelists (Houndmills, 1987)
E. M. Forster: The critical heritage, ed. by Philip Gardner (London, 1973)
Forster: A collection of Critical Essays, ed. by Malcolm Bradbury (New Jersey, 1966)
E. M. Forster, What I Believe, and other essays, Freethinker's Classics #3, ed. by Nicolas Walter (London, G. W. Foote & Co. Ltd, 1999 and 2016)
Furbank, P.N., E.M. Forster: A Life (London, 1977–1978)
Michael Haag, Alexandria: City of Memory (London and New Haven, 2004). This portrait of Alexandria during the first half of the 20th century includes a biographical account of E. M. Forster, his life in the city, his relationship with Constantine Cavafy, and his influence on Lawrence Durrell.
Judith Herz and Robert K. Martin, E. M. Forster: Centenary Revaluations (Macmillan Press, 1982)
Frank Kermode, Concerning E. M. Forster (London, Weidenfeld & Nicolson, 2010)
Francis King, E. M. Forster and his World (London, 1978).
Mary Lago, Calendar of the Letters of E. M. Forster (London: Mansell, 1985)
Mary Lago, Selected Letters of E. M. Forster (Cambridge, Mass.: Belknap Press of Harvard University Press, 1983–1985)
Mary Lago, E. M. Forster: A Literary Life (New York: St. Martin's Press, 1995)
Tim Leggatt, Connecting with E. M. Forster: a memoir (Hesperus Press, 2012)
Robin Jared Lewis, E. M. Forster's Passages to India (New York: Columbia University Press, 1979
John Sayre Martin, E. M. Forster. The endless journey (London, 1976)
Robert K. Martin and George Piggford, eds, Queer Forster (Chicago, 1997)
Pankaj Mishra, ed. "E. M. Forster", India in Mind: An Anthology. New York: Vintage Books, 2005: pp. 61–70
Wendy Moffat, E. M. Forster: A New Life (Bloomsbury, 2010)
Peter Rose, "The Peculiar Charms of E. M. Forster", Australian Book Review (December 2010/January 2011). Forster in his social context Retrieved 28 November 2013
Nicolas Royle, E. M. Forster (Writers & Their Work (London: Northcote House Publishers, 1999)
P. J. M. Scott, E. M. Forster: Our Permanent Contemporary, Critical Studies Series (London, 1984)
Sofia Sogos, "Nature and Mystery in Edward Morgan Forster's Tales", ed. Giorgia Sogos (Bonn: Free Pen Verlag, 2018)
Oliver Stallybrass, "Editor's Introduction", Howards End (Harmondsworth, UK: Penguin English Library, 1983) 
Wilfred H. Stone, The Cave and the Mountain: a study of E. M. Forster (1964)
Claude J. Summers, E. M. Forster (New York, 1983)

K. Natwar Singh, ed., E. M. Forster: A Tribute, With Selections from his Writings on India, Contributors: Ahmed Ali, Mulk Raj Anand, Narayana Menon, Raja Rao and Santha Rama Rau, (On Forster's Eighty Fifth Birthday), New York: Harcourt, Brace & World Inc., 1 January 1964
Kathleen Verduin, "Medievalism, Classicism, and the Fiction of E.M. Forster," Medievalism in the Modern World. Essays in Honour of Leslie J. Workman, ed. Richard Utz and Tom Shippey (Turnhout: Brepols, 1998), pp. 263–286
Alan Wilde, Art and Order. A Study of E.M. Forster (New York, 1967)

External links

Digital collections

Physical collections
Mary Lago Collection  at the University of Missouri Libraries. Research papers of a Forster scholar.
E M Forster at the British Library
Finding aid to E.M. Forster papers at Columbia University. Rare Book & Manuscript Library.
E.M. Forster Collection at the Harry Ransom Center at the University of Texas at Austin
Additional E.M. Forster manuscript items are housed at various archival repositories.

General portals
Aspects of E. M. Forster
"Only Connect": The unofficial Forster site
International E.M. Forster Society
E. M. Forster  at the Encyclopedia of Fantasy
E. M. Forster at the Encyclopedia of Science Fiction

LGBT
With Downcast Gays, Andrew Hodges and David Hutter, The Gay Liberation pamphlet (1974)
E.M. Forster on glbtq.com

 
1879 births
1970 deaths
20th-century English novelists
Alumni of King's College, Cambridge
English conscientious objectors
British people of World War I
English agnostics
English essayists
English humanists
English people of Irish descent
English people of Welsh descent
English short story writers
English gay writers
James Tait Black Memorial Prize recipients
English LGBT novelists
Male essayists
English male short story writers
Members of the Order of Merit
Members of the Order of the Companions of Honour
Modernist writers
National Council for Civil Liberties people
People educated at Tonbridge School
People from Dewas
People from Marylebone
People of Anglo-Irish descent
Academics of the Institute of Continuing Education
Red Cross personnel
Bloomsbury Group
British gay writers